Green Street station (signed as Green) is a rapid transit station in Boston, Massachusetts. It serves the MBTA's Orange Line and is located in the southern part of the Jamaica Plain neighborhood. Green Street is the least-used station on the Orange Line, averaging 3,055 weekday boardings in FY 2019. Like all Orange Line stations, it is fully accessible.

History

In 1842, the Boston and Providence Railroad (built starting in 1832) began offering service to Jamaica Plain station, located on the site of today's Green Street station; commuter rail service to the station would continue, uninterrupted, for nearly a century. Originally, the station was at ground level, but, starting in 1891, the Old Colony Railroad (which had acquired the B&P in 1888, and was itself acquired in 1893 by the New York, New Haven and Hartford Railroad) raised the section of its main line through Jamaica Plain (extending from Massachusetts Avenue to the current location of Forest Hills station) onto a 4-track stone embankment to eliminate dangerous grade crossings.  The project involved the building of five new stations in Roxbury and Jamaica Plain; the existing stations at Roxbury Crossing, Jamaica Plain, and Forest Hills were replaced with new elevated stations, while new stations were built at Heath Street and Boylston Street.  The brand-new Jamaica Plain station opened on June 1, 1897, along with the other four new stations.

Both Egleston and Forest Hills allowed direct connections to the Elevated from streetcar routes serving Roxbury, Dorchester, and Jamaica Plain (as well as, in the case of Forest Hills, to NYNH&H commuter trains); however, El ridership from the areas immediately surrounding the extension also proved high, and an infill station at Green Street (three blocks to the east of the NYNH&H station) opened on September 22, 1912.

Although the five NYNH&H stations in Jamaica Plain continued to operate for over three decades following the southward extension of the Washington Street Elevated, they were ultimately unable to compete with the Elevated, and all, including Jamaica Plain station, were closed on September 29, 1940 due to a lack of passengers.

In the 1960s, plans took hold to extend I-95 into downtown Boston along the NYNH&H's right-of-way and to replace the Washington Street Elevated (from 1967 known as the Orange Line) with a rapid transit line running in the new highway's median; these plans led to the demolition of hundreds of homes and the clearing of a long strip of land (the Southwest Corridor) extending through Roxbury and Jamaica Plain all the way up to Green Street, before the project was halted by highway revolts in 1969 and the February 11, 1970 announcement by Governor Francis W. Sargent of a moratorium on new highway construction within the Route 128 corridor, and eventually cancelled by Governor Sargent in 1972.  The cleared strip of land was eventually developed into the Southwest Corridor Park, and the Orange Line was moved to a new alignment along the Corridor in 1987 despite the cancellation of the project originally calling for its relocation.  This included a new rapid transit station at Green Street, on the site of the former NYNH&H station; the old Green Street station, along with the rest of the Washington Street Elevated, was permanently closed on April 30, 1987, and the new station opened on May 4, as did the eight other new stations on the southern Orange Line.

The entire Orange Line, including Green Street station, was closed from August 19 to September 18, 2022, during maintenance work.

Description

Green Street station primarily serves surrounding residential neighborhoods, as well Jamaica Plain's primary business district on Centre Street to the west. The station also provides access to many parks located in Jamaica Plain. Franklin Park is east of the station, and to its west is Jamaica Pond, part of Boston's Emerald Necklace of parks. The station is also located along the linear Southwest Corridor Park which tracks the Southwest Corridor.

Green Street was not built as a bus transfer station, and lacks an off-street busway. Since route 48 was discontinued on July 1, 2012, Green Street and nearby  have no direct bus connections.  , the next stop to the south, is a major bus transfer station.

Art gallery
Like many of the Orange Line stations built in the Southwest Corridor, Green Street has street-level retail space. Since the late 1990s, a succession of related art galleries has been located inside the station.

A local artist, James Hull, noted that the space was empty in 1996. He reached an agreement with the MBTA's leasing agent under which he paid no rent, and "The Gallery @ Green Street" opened in 1998. Staffed by volunteers, the gallery displayed contemporary works by a range of artists, including local students and non-commercial pieces by experienced artists. Hull later agreed to install air conditioning and a bathroom in return for use of the space.  

In December 2006, the space became the home of a successor gallery, the "Axiom Center for New and Experimental Media", which was operated by a non-profit artist collective, and featured rotating shows of artworks incorporating modern technology. In July 2012, Axiom closed the gallery, and the space became the "Boston Cyberarts Gallery", operated by an associated group.

References

External links

MBTA - Green Street
Boston Cyberarts Gallery 
 Green Street entrance from Google Maps Street View

Jamaica Plain, Boston
Orange Line (MBTA) stations
Railway stations in Boston
Stations along Old Colony Railroad lines
Stations along Boston and Providence Railroad lines
Railway stations in the United States opened in 1842
Railway stations in the United States opened in 1987
Railway stations closed in 1940
Railway stations in the United States opened in 1912